Zarneh (also known as Kāni Zarnah, Kanī Razneh, and Zarrīneh) is a city in and capital of Zarneh District, in Eyvan County, Ilam Province, Iran. At the 2006 census, its population was 2,909, in 605 families. The city is populated by Kurds.

See also
Sumar

References

Populated places in Eyvan County

Cities in Ilam Province
Kurdish settlements in Ilam Province